The city of Ottawa, Canada held municipal elections on December 6, 1976.

Mayor Lorry Greenberg is easily re-elected.

Mayor

Ottawa Board of Control
(4 elected)

City council

Ottawa Board of Education Trustees
Results for the OBE Trustees were as follows: 

Six to be elected in each zone
 

 

4 to be elected 

1 to be elected

References

Ottawa Journal, December 7, 1976

Municipal elections in Ottawa
1976 elections in Canada
1970s in Ottawa
1976 in Ontario